Delling may refer to:

 August Delling (1895–1962), World War I flying ace
 Gerhard Delling (born 1959), German journalist 
 Dellingr, a god of Norse mythology

See also
Dellinger (disambiguation)